Leilani Rorani  (formerly Joyce, née Marsh; born 15 April 1974) is a former New Zealand squash player. During her professional career, she reached the world number 1 ranking, won the British Open in 1999 and 2000, and finished runner-up at the World Open in 2000 and 2001.

Early life and family
Born Leilani Marsh in Hamilton on 15 April 1974, Rorani is the daughter of Neal Marsh and Maise Marsh (née Reihana). Of Māori descent, she affiliates to Ngāti Hine, Ngāi Te Rangi, and the Tainui confederation. She was educated at Church College of New Zealand, and is a member of the Church of Jesus Christ of Latter-day Saints. She married Paul Joyce, but the couple later divorced. In 2002, she married Blair Rorani in the Hamilton New Zealand Temple. They have four children.

Squash career
In the early part of her career she was known as Leilani Marsh and competed in the 1996 World Open as the number 14 seed under that name. Following her first marriage, she competed as Leilani Joyce, and then was known as Leilani Rorani in the latter stages of her career.

As a junior player, Rorani won the New Zealand under-13, under-15, under-17 and under-19 championships, the Australian under-17 and under-19 championship, and the Oceania under-19 championship.

During her 12-year career on the international tour, Rorani won 16 WISPA titles. She also won four New Zealand national titles. She was named Māori Sportsperson of the Year twice, and New Zealand Sportswoman of the Year in 2000.

Rorani retired from the professional tour in 2002, after winning gold medals in both the women's doubles and mixed doubles at the Commonwealth Games.

Honours
In 1990, she was awarded the New Zealand 1990 Commemoration Medal. In the 2001 New Year Honours, Rorani was appointed a Member of the New Zealand Order of Merit, for services to squash.

See also
 List of WISPA number 1 ranked players
 Official Women's Squash World Ranking

References

External links
 
 
  Leilani Joyce at Squashpics.com
 Mormon.org profile
 
 
 
 

|-

1974 births
Living people
New Zealand female squash players
Commonwealth Games gold medallists for New Zealand
Commonwealth Games medallists in squash
Squash players at the 1998 Commonwealth Games
Squash players at the 2002 Commonwealth Games
World Games bronze medalists
Sportspeople from Hamilton, New Zealand
New Zealand Latter Day Saints
Competitors at the 1997 World Games
Members of the New Zealand Order of Merit
Ngāti Hine people
Ngāi Te Rangi people
Tainui people
New Zealand Māori sportspeople
People educated at the Church College of New Zealand
Medallists at the 2002 Commonwealth Games